The 1991 World Aquatics Championships took place at the Claremont Superdrome in Perth, Western Australia from 3 to 13 January 1991 with 1142 participating athletes.

Medal table

Medal summary

Diving

Men

Women

Open water swimming

Men

Women

Swimming

Men

Women

Synchronised swimming

Water polo
Men

Women

Participating nations

External links
FINA Official Website
World Swimming Championship Results
1991 World Aquatics Championships Results  (PDF)

 
FINA World Aquatics Championships
World Aquatics
World Aquatics
World Aquatics Championships
International aquatics competitions hosted by Australia
1990s in Perth, Western Australia